Kadamjay District is a district in Batken Region, in south-western Kyrgyzstan.
The administrative seat lies at Kadamjay. The largest town of the district, Kadamjay, is located between the cities of Aydarken (Khaidarkan) and Kyzyl-Kyya.

The district is thought to have the second largest mercury-antimony deposit in the world.
Kadamjay Antimony Factory is one of the biggest factories in Kyrgyzstan. Khaidarkan Mercury Plant, built in 1942, was reported, as of 2005, to produce 300 to 600 metric tons of mercury per year.

Ak-Suu (white river) is the river which passes through Kadamjay. Jiydelik lake is a favorite picnic spot.

Population

Rural communities and villages
In total, Kadamjay District include 2 cities and 115 villages in 13 rural communities. Each rural community can consist of one or several villages. The rural communities and settlements in the Kadamjay District are:

 city Aydarken
 city Kadamjay (including 3 villages: Tash-Kyya, Pülgön, Chal-Tash)
 Absamat Masaliev (seat: Kara-Döbö; incl. Olagysh, Kakyr, Kojo, Kon, Alysh, Tash-Korgon and Leskhoz)
 Ak-Turpak (seat: Jangy-Jer; incl. Ak-Turpak, Jangy-Jer, Kalacha, Kara-Tumshuk, Kyzyl-Korgon, Ötükchü, Sary-Kamysh, Tokoy, Chogorok, Chong-Kara, Jash-Tilek, Örükzar, Ming-Chynar and Kelechek)
 Alga (seat: Alga; incl. Adyr, Böksö, Myrgyljek, Shak-Shak, Shybran, Chungkur-Kyshtak and Jangy-Chek)
 Birlik (seat: Ormosh; incl. Bel, Jal, Jangy-Korgon, Kichi-Aydarken, Molo, Sur, Syrt, Teskey, Chechme, Eshme, Jangy-Syrt and Yntymak)
 Chauvay aiyl okmotu (1: center - village: Chauvay)
 Khalmion (seat: Khalmion; incl. Baymaala, Güldürömö, Jangy-Ayyl, Joshuk, Irilesh, Kök-Tal, Kurulush, Noogardan, Tash-Döbö, Yntymak, Chekelik and Shady)
 Kötörmö (seat: Kyzyl-Bulak; incl. Ak-Kyya, Gayrat, Jalgyz-Bulak, Kara-Oot, Kara-Shoro, Kesken-Tash, Kötörmö, Tamasha and Langar)
 Kyrgyz-Kyshtak (seat: Kyrgyz-Kyshtak; incl. Kojo-Korum, Kaytpas, Bürgöndü OPKh and Bürgöndü PMK)
 Markaz (seat: Markaz; incl. Arpa-Say, Dostuk, Kök-Talaa, Mayak and Pyldyrak)
 Maydan (seat: Kara-Jygach; incl. Austan, Kara-Kyshtak, Karool, Kerege-Tash, Maydan, Pum, Kara-Döbö, Isfayram, Sary-Altyn, Bak, Akimbek and Jangy-Abad)
 Orozbekov (seat: Orozbekov; incl. Kuldu, Кosh-Döbö, Kuduk, Öndürüsh, Sary-Talaa and Uchkun)
 Sovet (1: center - village: Sovet)
 Üch-Korgon (seat: Üch-Korgon; incl. Valakish, Kakyr, Kalacha, Kaltak, Sulaymanabad, Raz'ezd, Sukhana, Chauvay, Boz, Kambar-Abad and Tajik-Kyshtak)

Note: Kyzyl-Kyya is a town of regional significance of Batken region, villages Karavan, Ak-Bulak and Jin-Jigen are parts of the town Kyzyl-Kyya.

External links
 A site about Kadamzhay

References 

Districts of Batken Region